This is the list of albums released under iHQ (SidusHQ). The list also includes albums released under its predecessor company EBM.

1999

2000–2009

2010–2019

References

IHQ (company)
Discographies of South Korean record labels